This is a list of trolleybus systems in Russia.  It includes all trolleybus systems, past and present.

List of trolleybus systems

Central Federal District

Far Eastern Federal District

Northwestern Federal District

Siberian Federal District

Southern Federal District

Urals Federal District

Volga Federal District

See also
 List of trolleybus systems, for all other countries
 List of town tramway systems in Russia
 List of light-rail transit systems
 List of rapid transit systems
 Trolleybuses in former Soviet Union countries
 Trolleybus usage by country

Sources

Books and periodicals
 Murray, Alan. 2000. "World Trolleybus Encyclopaedia". Reading, Berkshire, UK: Trolleybooks.
 Peschkes, Robert. 1987. "World Gazetteer of Tram, Trolleybus and Rapid Transit Systems, Part Two: Asia & USSR /Africa/Australia". London: Rapid Transit Publications.
 "Straßenbahnatlas ehem. Sowjetunion / Tramway Atlas of the former USSR". 1996. Berlin: Arbeitsgemeinschaft Blickpunkt Straßenbahn, in conjunction with Light Rail Transit Association, London.
 Tarkhov, Sergei. 2000. "Empire of the Trolleybus: Vol 1 - Russia". London: Rapid Transit Publications.
 Trolleybus Magazine (ISSN 0266-7452). National Trolleybus Association (UK). Bimonthly.

References

External links

 World Tram and Trolleybus Systems (photos and maps of some systems, in English and Russian)

Russia
Russia
Public transport in Russia